Commanders (in chief) – in the meaning of chief, commander, commanding general, supreme commander, or manager, etc. – of the border troops and organs of state security of the USSR and the RF were as follows.

External links 
 Official page border service of the FSB PF

See also 
 Soviet Border Troops
 Chronology of Soviet secret police agencies

Russian intelligence agencies
Soviet intelligence agencies